Whitechapel is a 1920 German silent crime film directed by Ewald André Dupont and starring Guido Herzfeld, Hans Mierendorff, and Otto Gebühr. The film was set around a variety theatre in London's East End suburb of Whitechapel.

Cast

References

Bibliography

External links

1920 films
1920 crime films
German crime films
Films of the Weimar Republic
German silent feature films
Films directed by E. A. Dupont
Films set in London
German black-and-white films
1920s German films
1920s German-language films